Gager is a village and a former municipality in the Vorpommern-Rügen district, in Mecklenburg-Vorpommern, Germany. Since January 2018, it is part of the new municipality Mönchgut. Besides Gager, the municipality also included the villages Groß Zicker and Groß Zicker Ausbau.

History
The place was part of the Principality of Rugen to 1326 and then the Duchy of Pomerania.

With the 1648 Treaty of Westphalia, Rügen and thus also Gager became part of Swedish Pomerania. In 1815 the town became part of the Prussian Province of Pomerania.

Since 1818 Gager belonged to the Kreis or district Rügen. Only in the years 1952 to 1955 it was part of Kreis Putbus.

Following the Division of Germany and establishment of the German Democratic Republic, a summer camp was operated in Groß Zicker. Following the German reunification in 1990, it became part of the state Mecklenburg-Vorpommern. The district Rügen was merged into the new district Vorpommern-Rügen in 2011.

In 1980, the movie was filmed The Three Other Seasons about the two villages and the lives of the villagers. The 1976 fairytale film The Blue Light was filmed among others in the landscapes of the peninsula.

Economy
The economy of Gager is mainly dominated by tourism.

References

External links

Official website of Gager and Groß Zicker

Towns and villages on Rügen
Mönchgut
Former municipalities in Mecklenburg-Western Pomerania